The 2020–21 Oklahoma Sooners women's basketball team represented the University of Oklahoma in the 2020–21 NCAA Division I women's basketball season. The Sooners were led by twenty-fifth year head coach Sherri Coale. The team played its home games at the Lloyd Noble Center in Norman, Oklahoma was a member of the Big 12 Conference.

After the season, Sherri Coale retired after twenty five season as head coach of the Sooners.  Jennie Baranczyk was announced as the new head coach in April 2021.

They finished the season 12–12, 9–9 in Big 12 play to finish in sixth place. In the Big 12 Tournament, they lost to Oklahoma State in the Quarterfinals.  They were not invited to the NCAA tournament or the WNIT.

Previous season

The Sooners the season 12–18, 5–13 in Big 12 play to finish in ninth place. The Big 12 Tournament, NCAA women's basketball tournament and WNIT were all cancelled before they began due to the COVID-19 pandemic.

Roster

Schedule

Source:

|-
!colspan=9 style=| Regular Season

|-
!colspan=9 style=| Big 12 Women's Tournament

Rankings

The Coaches Poll did not release a Week 2 poll and the AP Poll did not release a poll after the NCAA Tournament.

See also
 2020–21 Oklahoma Sooners men's basketball team

References

2020-21
2020–21 Big 12 Conference women's basketball season
2020 in sports in Oklahoma
2021 in sports in Oklahoma